WWJZ (640 AM) is a radio station licensed to Mount Holly, New Jersey, serving Philadelphia and the Delaware Valley. The station airs Catholic talk programming and is owned and operated by Relevant Radio.

The transmitter is located near the intersection of U.S. Route 206 and CR-530 in Pemberton Township, New Jersey, and station offices are in Fort Washington, Pennsylvania.  WWJZ operates with 50,000 watts in the daytime, the maximum permitted for AM stations by the Federal Communications Commission.  But because 640 kHz is a clear-channel frequency, WWJZ must reduce power to 950 watts at night to avoid interfering with other radio stations such as KFI 640 in Los Angeles, California and CBN in St. John's, Newfoundland and Labrador, Canada which are dominant Class A radio stations on 640 AM in the United States.

History
WWJZ was owned by John Farina, the originator of the sound adopted by Al Ham's Music of Your Life Adult standards format.  Farina's dream was to re-establish the signal he had on 1460 kHz in Mount Holly in the 1960s as WJJZ. With the help of his long-time friend and engineer, Ted Schober, he got New Jersey its first 50 kilowatt AM radio station in many years and was able to put his beloved sound on the air again.

Until the inception of WWJZ operation in 1992, there were no broadcast stations on 640 kHz on the East Coast. This was because KFI in Los Angeles is the clear-channel station on 640, in the days when Class I-A stations had few lesser stations on their frequencies, even thousands of miles away.  When the F.C.C. relaxed those regulations, it allowed several new stations, including WWJZ, to go on the air on the 640 frequency.

The music of Brook Benton, Tommy Dorsey, Margaret Whiting, Doris Day, Frankie Laine and many others aired from October 1992 into 1993, emanating from an ancient General Electric transmitter of the type used by the venerable WJZ in its early days as the flagship of the NBC Blue Network. Then a dispute between Farina and WWJZ's landlord, Edgar Cramer, put WWJZ off the air in August 1993.

Not to be defeated, Farina reestablished the station on a 1700 watt temporary transmitter in Florence, New Jersey, with the help of Nick Grand and Schober.  The sound was well received, but the weaker signal did not compare to the big transmitter.  Shortly thereafter, Farina had a stroke and died. Nick Grand continued the temporary operation as executor through the end of 1999, unable to make peace with Cramer until The Walt Disney Company made an offer to buy the station, to air its Radio Disney format in the Philadelphia Media market. WWJZ began airing the Radio Disney format on September 12, 1999. The first song WWJZ played as Radio Disney was Elvis Presley's cover of "Hound Dog".

On August 13, 2014, Disney put WWJZ and 22 other Radio Disney stations up for sale, in order to focus on digital distribution of the Radio Disney network. Disney originally planned to temporarily shut down the station on September 26, 2014. However, WWJZ remained on the air and continued carrying Radio Disney programming until the sale closed. On August 11, 2015, Relevant Radio's parent, the Starboard Media Foundation, agreed to purchase WWJZ for $3.5 million. The station began broadcasting Catholic programming, 24 hours a day, when the acquisition was consummated on September 23, 2015.  Radio Disney programming for the region later moved to the WXTU HD3 digital subchannel, which has since ceased operations.

Coverage
WWJZ 640 can be heard by day in the Philadelphia metropolitan area, the Jersey Shore, and parts of Delaware and Maryland. The 1,000-watt nighttime signal is heard over Central New Jersey and Philadelphia's northern suburbs.

References

External links
Relevant Radio

Mount Holly, New Jersey
WJZ
Catholic radio stations
Relevant Radio stations
Radio stations established in 1992
1992 establishments in New Jersey
Former subsidiaries of The Walt Disney Company